This is the discography for Dutch DJs Yellow Claw.

Studio albums

Extended plays

Singles

Other charted songs

Songwriting and production credits

Remixes

References 

Discographies of Dutch artists
Hip hop discographies